The 1895 College Football All-Southern Team consists of American football players selected to the College Football All-Southern Teams selected by various organizations in 1895. North Carolina running back George Stephens caught the first forward pass in the history of the sport.

All-Southerns of 1895

Ends
Robert H. Mudd, Virginia (WC)
Willie Merritt, North Carolina (WC)
Cook, Centre (ACR)
J. Cleves Short, Kentucky State (ACR)
Brink, Central (ACR)

Tackles
George L. Hicks, Virginia (WC)
Jim Baird, North Carolina (WC)
James W. Carnahan, Kentucky State (ACR)

Guards
John Penton, Virginia (WC)
David Kirkpatrick, North Carolina (WC)
Staples, Centre (ACR)
Glore, Louisville A. C. (ACR)

Centers
George Burlingame, Virginia (WC)
Walter "Pete" Murphy, North Carolina (WC-s)

Quarterbacks
Saunders Taylor, Virginia (WC)

Halfbacks
Arlie C. Jones, Virginia (WC)
George Stephens, North Carolina (WC)
Colvin, Centre (ACR)
Frew, Louisville A. C. (ACR)

Fullbacks
Oscar Lang, Virginia (WC)
Phil Connell, Vanderbilt (WC-s)
Swango, Louisville A. C. (ACR)
Gains, Central (ACR) 
McDonald, Louisville A. C. (ACR)

Unlisted 
Joe Frasier, Kentucky State (ACR)

Key
WC = selected by "Whitper Casney" (a play on Casper Whitney) in the University of Virginia's College Topics. It had substitutes, denoted with a small S. It seems the team also picked players from prior years including 1894, at least.

ACR = selected by A. C. Robinson.

See also
South's Oldest Rivalry

References

College Football All-Southern Teams
All-Southern team